Arriaza is a surname. Notable people with the surname include:
 Adriana Salvatierra Arriaza, Bolivian politician
 Bernardo Arriaza (born 1959), Chilean physical anthropologist
 Eugenio Arriaza, Cuban lawyer and poet
 Juan Bautista Arriaza (1770–1837), Spanish poet and writer